Notarchus is a genus of sea slugs or sea hares, marine opisthobranch gastropod mollusks in the family Aplysiidae, the sea hares.

Description
The parapodia (fleshy winglike outgrowths) of Notarchus are almost completely fused, forming the parapodial cavity.

Life habits
These sea hares are able to swim by jet propulsion, through sucking in water through the small anterior opening of the parapodial cavity and then squirting water from the back of it. While doing so, they tumble and make a series of backward somersaults. In this unusual manner, they move quickly out of harm's way over short distances.

Species
Species within the genus Notarchus include:
Notarchus indicus Schweigger, 1820 : Indian sea hare
Distribution : in shallow waters of NW Indian Ocean, NW Pacific, Mediterranean.
Description : fine papillae scattered over the mantle; no armed penis; feeds on green alga Caulerpa.
Notarchus punctatus Philippi, 1836
Distribution : Japan, Indo-Chinese seas, Mediterranean.
Length : 5 cm
Description : penis with spines.

Species brought into synonymy
 Notarchus ceylonicus Farran, 1905: synonym of Notarchus indicus Schweigger, 1820
 Notarchus pleii (Rang, 1828): synonym of  Bursatella leachii pleii Rang, 1828
 Notarchus polyomma Mörch, 1863: synonym of Stylocheilus striatus (Quoy & Gaimard, 1832)
 Notarchus savignyanus : synonym of Bursatella leachii savigniana Audouin, 1826
 Notarchus timidus Risso, 1818: synonym of Elysia timida (Risso, 1818)

References

 Yonow N. (2012) Opisthobranchs from the western Indian Ocean, with descriptions of two new species and ten new records (Mollusca, Gastropoda). ZooKeys 197: 1–129. [22 May 2012]

External links
 
 Image of Notarchus indicus
 Images of Notarchus punctatus

Aplysiidae
Gastropod genera
Taxa named by Georges Cuvier